iPawn is a financial services company serving as an online lender and reseller for luxury goods. The company holds an online pawn shop license with headquarters in Tyler, Texas. iPawn raised over $4 million in investment and has been cited as one of the leading companies in transitioning the pawn industry to the internet.

Services 
iPawn provides two main services:
 Non-recourse loans, otherwise known as pawn loans or asset-based loans, against valuables.
 Buying and selling pre-owned valuables.

Both lending and retail services are rendered to consumers and small businesses.  iPawn provides its services against luxury items such as jewelry, diamonds, gemstones, precious metals and high-end watches.

History 
The idea came after learning about the high interest rates charged by pawn shops. The company launched its services to the public in July 2012. In March 2013 iPawn closed $4 million in its second round of financing from a group of angel investors led by Dr. Rafi Gridron. On May 12, 2014 iPawn announced the launch of a new brand called Worthy dealing only in after-market sales.

Brick & Mortar Pawn Shop Vs. Online Pawn Shop 
While services provided by a brick and mortar pawn shop are similar to those provided by the online ones, there are few main differences: most notably, the means by which services are rendered. In a brick and mortar pawn shop, the process of receiving a loan or selling a valuable is done in person while in an online pawn shop the process is conducted through the internet and a courier of choice. The low inventory overhead results in the ability to provide higher value and lower interest rates. Another notable difference is the appraisal process of the submitted valuables: in a brick and mortar pawn shop, the appraisal is done in the local shop itself while in an online pawn shop, all items are shipped to a central facility where the appraisal is made.

Licenses and Accreditation 
iPawn is a licensed pawn shop certified by the Texas Office of Consumer Credit Commissioner (OCCC). Additionally, iPawn holds a precious dealer certificate, also granted by the Texas OCCC. iPawn is accredited by the Better Business Bureau.

Partnerships 
iPawn has partnered in 2012 with FedEx and ParcelPro to provide insured shipping services. iPawn also partnered with Delta Lloyd in the same year to provide insurance to its facilities.

In the Media 
In August 2013, MSN Money Watch discussed how iPawn caters to affluent individuals and families that don't need money immediately but want a more sizable  loan to help their cash flow. 
In an article published in July 2013, Reuters discusses the benefits of the purely online transactions carried out by iPawn, focusing on the desired discretion amidst the negative stigma of pawn shops.

In May 2013,LearnVest brought into focus the story of a dentist who chose to use iPawn to sell family jewelry instead of a traditional bank loan.

Yahoo New Zealand published an article in March 2013 shedding light on the new world of online pawn shops and what to expect when utilizing their services.

South Coast Today Describes in an article published January 2013 how small business are turning to pawn shops for short-term loans, a better suited alternative to traditional bank loans.

Early in 2013, TIME Business and Finance discussed the reinvention of the pawn industry and its transition to the internet.

KETK NBC Sits down with iPawn COO in December 2012 to talk about bringing the pawn shop online.

In December 2012, NuWire Investor provided a detailed layout of the upscale online pawn industry and its move away from the originally bad stigma attached to pawn shops.

Later in December 2012, The New York Post wrote about the appeal of high-end online pawn shops from small business owners to wealthy celebrities.

See also 
 Pawnbroker
 Arrowhead Pawn Shop

References 

Pawn shops
American companies established in 2011
Financial services companies established in 2011
Retail companies established in 2011
Internet properties established in 2011
2011 establishments in Texas